Elaeocarpus fraseri is a species of flowering plant in the Elaeocarpaceae family. It is endemic to Peninsular Malaysia.

References

fraseri
Endemic flora of Peninsular Malaysia
Vulnerable plants
Taxonomy articles created by Polbot